José Homobono Anaya y Gutiérrez (born 10 Nov, 1836 in Pegueros, Diocese of Guadalajara, Jalisco – died 10 Dec, 1906 in Chilapa de Álvarez, Diocese of Chilapa, Guerrero) was a Mexican clergyman and bishop for the Roman Catholic Diocese of Chilpancingo-Chilapa, as well as for Roman Catholic Diocese of Sinaloa. He became ordained in 1860. He was appointed bishop in 1898. He died in 1906.

References

20th-century Roman Catholic bishops in Mexico
1836 births
1906 deaths
People from Guadalajara, Jalisco
19th-century Roman Catholic bishops in Mexico